Stary Ropsk is a rural locality (a selo) in Klimovsky District, Bryansk Oblast, Russia. The population was 185 as of 2013. There are 10 streets.

Geography 
Stary Ropsk is located 10 km south of Klimovo (the district's administrative centre) by road. Novy Ropsk is the nearest rural locality.

References 

Rural localities in Klimovsky District